Lake is a second-class township in Wayne County, Pennsylvania, United States. The township's population was 5,269 at the time of the 2010 United States Census.

Geography

Communities
The following villages are located in Lake Township:

Avoy
Gravity
Lake Ariel (also called Ariel)
Maplewood
Pink
Tresslarville(also called Tresslers Corners)

Demographics

As of the census of 2010, there were 5,269 people, 2,156 households, and 1,511 families residing in the township.  The population density was 189.5 people per square mile (73.2/km2).  There were 4,009 housing units at an average density of 144.2/sq mi (56.3/km2).  The racial makeup of the township was 96% White, 1.6% African American, 0.2% Native American, 0.4% Asian, 0.7% from other races, and 1.1% from two or more races. Hispanic or Latino of any race were 2.9% of the population.

There were 2,156 households, out of which 21% had children under the age of 18 living with them, 58.7% were married couples living together, 7.9% had a female householder with no husband present, and 29.9% were non-families. 24.4% of all households were made up of individuals, and 10.6% had someone living alone who was 65 years of age or older.  The average household size was 2.39 and the average family size was 2.83.

In the township the population was spread out, with 19% under the age of 18, 57.8% from 18 to 64, and 23.2% who were 65 years of age or older.  The median age was 49 years.

The median income for a household in the township was $33,887, and the median income for a family was $37,821. Males had a median income of $29,609 versus $21,406 for females. The per capita income for the township was $16,274.  About 8.7% of families and 10.5% of the population were below the poverty line, including 13.8% of those under age 18 and 12.8% of those age 65 or over.

References

Townships in Wayne County, Pennsylvania
Townships in Pennsylvania